Eric Wendell Reveno (born March 12, 1966) is an American assistant college basketball coach at Oregon State and the former head men's basketball coach at Portland. He was named the West Coast Conference coach of the year for the 2008–09 season after a third-place finish in conference.

Prior to Portland, Reveno was an assistant coach at Stanford University, where he played collegiately as a starting center. After graduating, Reveno played professionally for Nippon Mining in Japan from 1989 to 1993. Reveno was fired as Portland's head coach on March 15, 2016, after ten years and a 140–178 record.

In May, after his firing from Portland, Reveno was hired as an assistant at Georgia Tech to be part of new head coach Josh Pastner's coaching staff. At Georgia Tech he has been credited with developing Ben Lammers into an All-ACC player and ACC Defensive Player of the Year.

Head coaching record

Source

References

1966 births
Living people
American expatriate basketball people in Japan
American men's basketball coaches
American men's basketball players
Basketball coaches from California
Basketball players from California
Centers (basketball)
Georgia Tech Yellow Jackets men's basketball coaches
People from San Mateo County, California
People from Stanford, California
Portland Pilots men's basketball coaches
Stanford Cardinal men's basketball coaches
Stanford Cardinal men's basketball players